The Howard School in Rosebud County near Forsyth, Montana was built in 1905.  It was listed on the National Register of Historic Places in 2004.  The listing included the schoolhouse, a well house, two outhouses, and a playground.

The school is a large, rectangular, two-story white clapboard building, built to replace an original log cabin school. It was extended in 1916. The school building is visible from many miles away.

References

School buildings on the National Register of Historic Places in Montana
Defunct schools in Montana
Schools in Rosebud County, Montana
1905 establishments in Montana
National Register of Historic Places in Rosebud County, Montana
School buildings completed in 1905